The Great Western Railway Prince Class 2-2-2 broad gauge steam locomotives for passenger train work. This class was introduced into service between August 1846 and March 1847, and withdrawn between January and September 1870.

From about 1865, the Prince Class locomotives became part of the Priam Class, along with the Fire Fly Class locomotives.

Locomotives
 Moose (1846 - 1870)
Named after the animal, the elk.
 Peri (1846 - 1870)
A peri is a fallen angel in Persian mythology.
 Prince (1846 - 1870)
Named in honour of Albert, Prince Consort to Queen Victoria.
 Queen (1847 - 1870)
Named in honour of Queen Victoria
 Sylph (1847 - 1870)
A sylph is an invisible, mythological creature.
 Witch (1846 - 1870)
This locomotive was fitted with slightly larger   driving wheels. It was named after a female practitioner of witchcraft, a witch.

References

 
 
 

Prince
2-2-2 locomotives
Broad gauge (7 feet) railway locomotives
Railway locomotives introduced in 1846